is a Japanese actress and gravure idol who is represented by the talent agency, FMG.

Biography
Mamoru's hobbies are cooking and listening to music and her skill is ballet. Her father is Cambodian.

Mamoru has a tall slender body type with big breasts. Gekkan Series producer Iwata called them the "Strongest Breasts in Gravure". In October 2009, Gekkan Asana Mamoru is released and she became the first newcomer in the Gekkan series since Haruka Igawa.

In December 2009, Mamoru was awarded the "Miura Award" in the '09 Gravure Tamashi Awards

Her previous agency was LRF, for working for the Gekkan, and her Gekkan blog was closed because of the "circumstances of the management policy". Mamoru later moved to her current agency in December 2009.

Filmography

TV series

Films

References

External links
 Official profile 

Japanese gravure idols
Japanese people of Cambodian descent
1990 births
Living people
Actresses from Tokyo
21st-century Japanese actresses